John Kinnear may refer to:

John Kinnear (Irish politician) (1824–1894), Member of Parliament for Donegal 1880–1885
John Boyd Kinnear (1828–1920), Scottish lawyer, writer and radical Liberal politician
John R. Kinnear (1842–1912), American politician from the state of Washington